In enzymology, a mRNA (2'-O-methyladenosine-N6-)-methyltransferase is an enzyme that catalyzes the chemical reaction

S-adenosyl-L-methionine + m7G(5')pppAm  S-adenosyl-L-homocysteine + m7G(5')pppm6Am (mRNA containing an N6,2'-O-dimethyladenosine cap)

Thus, the two substrates of this enzyme are S-adenosyl methionine and m7G(5')pppAm, whereas its two products are S-adenosylhomocysteine and m7G(5')pppm6Am (mRNA containing an N6,2'-O-dimethyladenosine cap).

This enzyme belongs to the family of transferases, specifically those transferring one-carbon group methyltransferases.  The systematic name of this enzyme class is S-adenosyl-L-methionine:mRNA (2'-O-methyladenosine-N6-)-methyltransferase. Other names in common use include messenger ribonucleate 2'-O-methyladenosine NG-methyltransferase, S-adenosyl-L-methionine:mRNA, and (2'-O-methyladenosine-6-N-)-methyltransferase.

References

 

EC 2.1.1
Enzymes of unknown structure